Livingston is an unincorporated community in Floyd County, in the U.S. state of Georgia.

History
A post office called Livingston was established in 1834, and remained in operation until 1901. The community most likely was named after Leonidas F. Livingston, a U.S. Representative from Georgia.

References

Geography of Floyd County, Georgia
Former county seats in Georgia (U.S. state)
Unincorporated communities in Floyd County, Georgia
Unincorporated communities in Georgia (U.S. state)